Douglas Ross Bush is an American government official who serves as the 7th United States assistant secretary of the Army for acquisition, logistics, and technology.

Education 
Bush earned a Bachelor of Science degree in political science from the United States Military Academy in 1993 and a Master of Arts in national security studies from Georgetown University in 2002.

Career 
From 1993 to 1998, Bush was an armor officer in the United States Army, assigned to Fort Stewart.

In 2001 and 2002, he was a military analyst for the Association of the United States Army.

In 2002 and 2003, he was a legislative correspondent in the office of Senator Bill Nelson. From 2003 to 2005, he was a military legislative correspondent in the office of Congressman Jim Cooper. From 2005 to 2007, he served as the legislative director for Congressman Neil Abercrombie.

Bush then worked as a professional staffer for the United States House Committee on Armed Services from 2007 to 2019.

From 2019 to 2021, he served as deputy staff director for the House Armed Services Committee, where he was responsible for committee administration and operations, while also advising Chairman Adam Smith (D-WA) on policy matters.

Bush served as Acting Assistant Secretary of the Army for Acquisition, Logistics and Technology (ASAALT) in 2021.

Bush was sworn in as Joe Biden's ASAALT on 15 February 2022.

References

Year of birth missing (living people)
Living people
United States Military Academy alumni
United States Army officers
Georgetown University alumni
Biden administration personnel
United States Department of Defense officials
United States Assistant Secretaries of the Army